Glasswort salad or samphire salad is a salad in Turkish cuisine. Glasswort salad is made with glasswort, lemon juice, olive oil and garlic. It is commonly served as a meze.

Variations 
 Beyaz peynirli kuru domatesli deniz börülcesi salatası(Glasswort salad with Sun-dried tomato and beyaz peynir) 
 Karidesli deniz börülcesi salatası(Glasswort salad with shrimp)

See also
 List of salads

References

External links 
 Deniz Börülcesi Salatasi
 Sarımsaklı Deniz Börülcesi Tarifi

Turkish cuisine
Salads
Vegetable dishes